James Michael "Jim" Cantwell (born October 25, 1966) is an American politician and lawyer from Massachusetts. A Democrat, Cantwell is the State Director for United States Senator Ed Markey. Cantwell previously served as the Massachusetts State Representative for the 4th Plymouth district from 2008 to 2018. The district encompasses Marshfield and precincts 1, 2, 4, 5, & 6 of Scituate.

Education and early career
Cantwell, a native of Marshfield, graduated from Marshfield High School in 1984. He completed his undergraduate degree from Boston College in 1988. He received a J.D. degree from Boston College Law School in 1994. He attended the University of Paris in 1987.

After graduating from law school, Cantwell served as an assistant district attorney for Norfolk county. He was also elected to the Board of Selectmen in Marshfield in 1996, and held that position for three years (he also served as chairman of the board). After his tenure at the Norfolk county District Attorney's office, Cantwell took a position as a staff attorney for United States Representative William Delahunt.

Cantwell was also a co-owner and partner of Graeber, Davis and Cantwell, a small general-practice law firm in Quincy, Massachusetts.

State Representative
Cantwell made his first bid for the State House in 2000 after his tenure as a Marshfield selectman. Cantwell was the Democratic candidate for the Plymouth and Norfolk State Senate seat, running against Republican incumbent Robert L. Hedlund. Cantwell was defeated in that race.  Cantwell then ran for the 4th Plymouth State Representative seat in 2008 following the retirement of the incumbent, Democrat Frank Hynes. Cantwell won a 4-way primary race to face Marshfield independent candidate John Valianti in the general election. Cantwell won the election with 62% of the vote.  He was also reelected in 2010, 2012, and 2014.

As a State Representative, Cantwell sat on the House Committee on Bonding, Capital Expenditures and State Assets, the Joint Committee on Revenue, and the Joint Committee on Financial Services.  His legislative achievements include helping to create the Seafood-Marketing Committee  and helping to get the Department of Transportation to begin a widening project for Route 139 in Marshfield.  Cantwell also voted for the 2011 casino gaming bill.

Electoral history

External links
 Massachusetts State Legislature - Member Profile: James M. Cantwell
 Jim Cantwell's Campaign Website

References

Living people
Massachusetts Democrats
1966 births
University of Paris alumni
20th-century American lawyers
21st-century American lawyers
People from Marshfield, Massachusetts
Boston College alumni
Boston College Law School alumni
21st-century American politicians
American expatriates in France